Pöhlberg is a mountain of Saxony, southeastern Germany.

Mountains of Saxony
Annaberg-Buchholz
Mountains of the Ore Mountains